Metabetaeus lohena, the anchialine snapping shrimp, is a species of alpheid shrimp endemic to Hawaii.

Description 
Metabetaeus lohena is an alpheid scavenger, which will also hunt small anchialine invertebrates. M. lohena grows to lengths of 18 mm and are pale pink to vibrant red in colour. Shrimp possess large claws and a clearly visible mandibular spot. Females once gravid will produce a mass of 20 to 29 eggs. M. lohena larvae lack a yolk sack, which suggests the species possess a planktotrophic larval feeding phase. M. lohena have been recorded to live for up to 6 years.

Distribution and habitat 
Metabetaeus lohena has a widespread distribution in Hawaii where it is not only native, but also endemic. They live in anchialine pools, which are landlocked bodies of water with underground connections to the ocean. These pools often possess fresh or brackish water near the surface, but saline water at depth. Shrimp can be found naturally living in at salinities ranging from 2 to 36 ppt and water temperatures at around 20 °C (68 °F) or higher. Populations of M. lohena coexist with their prey species ʻōpaeʻula shrimp (Halocaridina rubra) and their known range entirely overlaps.

References 

Crustaceans described in 1960
Crustaceans
Crustacean taxonomy